Sverre Stub (born 24 February 1946) is a Norwegian diplomat.

He is a siv.øk. by education, and started working for the Norwegian Ministry of Foreign Affairs in 1971. He served at the United Nations delegation in Geneva from 1986 to 1990, at the embassy in Paris from 1990 to 1994, and in the Ministry of Foreign Affairs again from 1994 to 1999. He served as the Norwegian ambassador to Jordan from 2001 to 2006, and to Greece from 2006 to 2011.

References

1946 births
Living people
Norwegian civil servants
Ambassadors of Norway to Jordan
Ambassadors of Norway to Greece
Norwegian expatriates in Switzerland